Robert "Robbie" Gray (born 30 March 1988) is a former professional Australian rules footballer who played for the Port Adelaide Football Club in the Australian Football League (AFL). He was recruited with the 55th overall selection in the 2006 national draft. Gray is often considered to be amongst Port Adelaide's greatest ever players.

Early life
The son of Robert Snr and Sue, Robbie Gray spent his early years with his two older sisters and parents in Bairnsdale. They moved to Blackburn when Robbie turned 10.

Gray impressed in 2006 with TAC Cup club Oakleigh Chargers, kicking 56 goals. He also played for the Victoria Metro's under 18 side, in a team composed of fellow AFL draftees Bachar Houli, Matthew Kreuzer, Tom Hawkins and David Mackay. Despite this, Gray was not seen as a fancied draft option, due to his unfashionable style of play. His chances took a hit when he missed a draft camp due to injury. He did, however, attract interest from Port Adelaide after impressing their recruiters. Head recruiter at the time, Mick Moylan was impressed with his off-field discipline, with Gray maintaining an 8 and a half-hour job.

Subsequently, Gray was picked by Port Adelaide in the 2006 draft who used their fourth pick, becoming the 55th pick overall.

AFL career 

After showing strong form in the SANFL with West Adelaide, Gray was given his AFL debut, along with fellow draftee Justin Westhoff. Gray contributed with 13 disposals and 4 marks and 2 behinds. In Round 12 of the 2007 Season, he kicked 4 goals in a match against Essendon, in which Port Adelaide won by 31 points. He received the round 12 AFL Rising Star nomination for his efforts.

During these games Robbie Gray consolidated his place in the Power line up until a calf injury relapse against the Richmond Tigers at the MCG kept Gray out.

Gray started the 2008 pre-season strongly, suggesting he was over chronic soft tissue injuries and ready to have a larger impact. Fellow team-mate Brett Ebert said "Robbie's great. He's stronger and fitter than ever before and we saw last year just how clever he is in front of goals. Robbie's worked hard over the summer and if he can stay fit, I think he'll be in for a big year." Soft tissue injuries have restricted Gray to forward roles, though he is hoping to play more of a midfield role in the future. He also signed a new contract for Port Adelaide, which will keep him at the club until 2010. Gray missed the start of the season through injury and only received his first senior game for the year in round 7, after showing good form for West Adelaide. Gray played all matches until round 14, before injuring his ankle at training, with his best performance being a 20 possession and 12 mark game against Hawthorn. He also impressed in Ports hefty Round 16 loss to Geelong after being moved into the midfield. He returned for two matches late in the 2008 season and played a pivotal role in Port Adelaide's surprise defeat of North Melbourne, by scoring 3 goals.

Gray had an outstanding year for Port Adelaide, despite the club having a difficult year. He was Port's most valuable player according to an AFL poll, proving he is a fan favourite. He was also rated by the club's staff, who awarded him the 2009 most improved award, to go with his 4th placing in the John Cahill Medal. Gray kicked 30 goals in 2009, as well as 23 goal assists - top 6 in the AFL. He also received 6 Brownlow Medal votes, despite never polling previously. His standout performance of the year was against Hawthorn, where he kicked 4 goals in a tight win to the Power, earning 3 Brownlow votes for his efforts.

In Round 6 2010, Gray won the Showdown Medal for a five-goal effort against Adelaide.

He finished the 2011 season on 32 goals, making him the leading goalkicker, a goal ahead of Jay Schulz.

In Round 4, 2012, Gray hyper extended his knee in the dying seconds of the game against Collingwood, requiring a knee reconstruction and missing the remainder of the season.

At the start of 2013 Gray decided to change his number from 17 to 9. The number 9 was his junior number. He also wanted to start again after his knee reconstruction.

Gray had his breakout season in 2014, averaging 25 possessions and six clearances a match, while also kicking 42 goals and leading the league in goal assists. He polled votes in 18 of 22 games to win the AFL Coaches' Association (AFLCA) Champion player award and was named in the 2014 All-Australian team, as well as winning his first John Cahill Medal.

Gray backed up his break out 2014 campaign with another outstanding season in 2015. He averaged 26 disposals, almost 8 clearances and more than a goal a game. In one of his best games for 2015, he won his second Showdown Medal in the first Showdown against the Adelaide Crows. At season's end, he was selected in the All-Australian team for the second consecutive year as well as winning his second consecutive John Cahill Medal.

In 2016, Grey was awarded the Merv Agars Medal as the best performed South Australian based AFL player.

In October 2017, Port Adelaide FC released the news that Gray had been diagnosed with testicular cancer after the end of their finals campaign.

Gray returned to pre-season training late in 2017 and played the entire 2018 AFL season. In Showdown 44, Gray kicked six goals, 5 of them were in the third quarter. He eventually won the Showdown Medal as being the best player on the ground. He is currently Port Adelaide's 2nd leading AFL goalkicker, behind Warren Tredrea.

Gray played game 250 in 2021 against the Gold Coast Suns, but injured his ankle in the same game. As a result, Gray would miss 6 weeks of the season.

Persistent knee niggles kept Gray to only 16 games in the 2022 season. He announced his retirement on 16th August 2022, and would fittingly play his retirement game in Showdown LII.

Statistics
 Statistics are correct as of the end of the 2019 season
 
|- style="background-color: #EAEAEA"
! scope="row" style="text-align:center" | 2007
|style="text-align:center;"|
| 17 || 5 || 7 || 6 || 33 || 19 || 52 || 18 || 7 || 1.4 || 1.2 || 6.6 || 3.8 || 10.4 || 3.6 || 1.4
|-
! scope="row" style="text-align:center" | 2008
|style="text-align:center;"|
| 17 || 10 || 15 || 12 || 76 || 55 || 131 || 52 || 12 || 1.5 || 1.2 || 7.6 || 5.5 || 13.1 || 5.2 || 1.2
|- style="background-color: #EAEAEA"
! scope="row" style="text-align:center" | 2009
|style="text-align:center;"|
| 17 || 20 || 30 || 19 || 157 || 166 || 323 || 77 || 62 || 1.5 || 1.0 || 7.9 || 8.3 || 16.2 || 3.9 || 3.1
|-
! scope="row" style="text-align:center" | 2010
|style="text-align:center;"|
| 17 || 11 || 18 || 12 || 81 || 79 || 160 || 34 || 36 || 1.6 || 1.1 || 7.4 || 7.2 || 14.5 || 3.1 || 3.3
|- style="background-color: #EAEAEA"
! scope="row" style="text-align:center" | 2011
|style="text-align:center;"|
| 17 || 22 || 32 || 14 || 216 || 179 || 395 || 81 || 85 || 1.5 || 0.6 || 9.8 || 8.1 || 18.0 || 3.7 || 3.9
|-
! scope="row" style="text-align:center" | 2012
|style="text-align:center;"|
| 17 || 2 || 2 || 4 || 13 || 16 || 29 || 6 || 9 || 1.0 || 2.0 || 6.5 || 8.0 || 14.5 || 3.0 || 4.5
|- style="background-color: #EAEAEA"
! scope="row" style="text-align:center" | 2013
|style="text-align:center;"|
| 9 || 20 || 15 || 15 || 187 || 150 || 337 || 62 || 72 || 0.8 || 0.8 || 9.4 || 7.5 || 16.9 || 3.1 || 3.6
|-
! scope="row" style="text-align:center" | 2014
|style="text-align:center;"|
| 9 || 25 || 42 || 33 || 302 || 320 || 622 || 97 || 69 || 1.7 || 1.3 || 12.1 || 12.8 || 24.9 || 3.9 || 2.8
|- style="background-color: #EAEAEA"
! scope="row" style="text-align:center" | 2015
|style="text-align:center;"|
| 9 || 21 || 25 || 12 || 252 || 300 || 552 || 60 || 91 || 1.2 || 0.6 || 12.0 || 14.3 || 26.3 || 2.9 || 4.3
|-
! scope="row" style="text-align:center" | 2016
|style="text-align:center;"|
| 9 || 19 || 25 || 16 || 237 || 262 || 499 || 51 || 91 || 1.2 || 0.8 || 11.3 || 12.5 || 23.8 || 2.4 || 4.3
|- style="background-color: #EAEAEA"
! scope="row" style="text-align:center" | 2017
|style="text-align:center;"|
| 9 || 23 || 47 || 29 || 232 || 204 || 436 || 99 || 58 || 2.2 || 1.4 || 11.0 || 9.7 || 20.8 || 4.7 || 2.8
|-
! scope="row" style="text-align:center" | 2018
|style="text-align:center;"|
| 9 || 21 || 36 || 18 || 193 || 246 || 439 || 74 || 67 || 1.7 || 0.9 || 9.2 || 11.7 || 20.9 || 3.5 || 3.2
|- style="background-color: #EAEAEA"
! scope="row" style="text-align:center" | 2019
|style="text-align:center;"|
| 9 || 19 || 24 || 14 || 189 || 232 || 421 || 71 || 42 || 1.3 || 0.7 || 9.9 || 12.2 || 22.2 || 3.7 || 2.2
|- class="sortbottom"
! colspan=3| Career
! 218
! 318
! 204
! 2168
! 2228
! 4396
! 782
! 701
! 1.5
! 0.9
! 9.9
! 10.2
! 20.2
! 3.6
! 3.2
|}

Honours and achievements

Individual
All-Australian: 2014, 2015, 2017, 2018
AFLCA Champion Player of the Year Award: 2014
Showdown Medal: 2010 (Round 6), 2015 (Round 5), 2018 (Round 8), 2018 (Round 20), 2019 (Round 16)
Australian Representative Honours in International Rules Football: 2011, 2014, 2015
Port Adelaide F.C. Leading Club Goalkicker Award: 2011, 2018
Port Adelaide F.C. Most Improved Player Award: 2009
AFL Rising Star Nominee: 2007 (Round 12)

References

External links

1988 births
Living people
Port Adelaide Football Club players
Port Adelaide Football Club players (all competitions)
Australian rules footballers from Melbourne
West Adelaide Football Club players
Oakleigh Chargers players
All-Australians (AFL)
John Cahill Medal winners
Australia international rules football team players
People from Blackburn, Victoria